Nicole Kiil-Nielsen (born 21 August 1949, in Larchamp) is a French politician and Member of the European Parliament elected in the 2009 European election for the West France constituency. She is a member of The Greens.

She has been a feminist and anti-nuclear activist since the 1960s. She won her first elected office in the 2001 municipal elections in Rennes as a candidate on Edmond Hervé's winning left-wing coalition list. She became assistant to the Mayor in charge of decentralized co-operation and international solidarity. However, in the 2008 municipal elections, she did not join Daniel Delaveau's left-wing union list and led her own list, Rennes verte et solidaire, which won 8.93% in the first round and did not participate in the runoff.

In the 2009 European elections, she was the second candidate on the Europe Écologie list in the West region and was elected to the European Parliament.

References

1949 births
Living people
MEPs for West France 2009–2014
21st-century women MEPs for France
Europe Ecology – The Greens MEPs